Laverton Downs Station is a pastoral lease that has operated as both a cattle station and a sheep station in Western Australia.

The area supports stands of saltbush and other herbage with grassy plains.

The owner, J. MacCalmont, had vastly improved the property and was running 3,000 head of cattle. It was acquired a pair of Queenslanders, Messrs Allen and Rennie. By 1928 sheep were being run at Laverton Downs with a flock of 5,500 grazing the land. Some 9,000 sheep were shorn during shearing in 1930.

George William Anderson owned the property before 1940 and was still running it in 1948.

See also
List of ranches and stations
List of pastoral leases in Western Australia

References

Homesteads in Western Australia
Pastoral leases in Western Australia
Stations (Australian agriculture)
Goldfields-Esperance